The 2007–08 Texas–Arlington Mavericks men's basketball team represented the University of Texas at Arlington during the 2007–08 NCAA Division I men's basketball season. The Mavericks, led by second year head coach Scott Cross, played their home games at Texas Hall and were members of the West Division of the Southland Conference. The Mavericks won the Southland Basketball tournament to receive an automatic bid into the NCAA tournament. As No. 16 seed in the South region, they lost in the first round to eventual National runner-up Memphis, 87–63.

Roster

Schedule and results

|-
!colspan=9 style=| Regular season

|-
!colspan=9 style=| Southland tournament

|-
!colspan=9 style=| NCAA tournament

,

References

UT Arlington Mavericks men's basketball seasons
Texas-Arlington
Texas-Arlington
Texas-Arlington Mavericks basketball
Texas-Arlington Mavericks basketball